Eduard "Edy" Dublin (born 9 February 1943) is a Luxembourgian former footballer who played at both professional and international levels as a midfielder.

Career
Born in Emerange, Dublin played club football in Luxembourg and France for Mondorf-les-Bains, Nancy, Mulhouse, Besançon, Spora Luxembourg and Aris Bonnevoie.

He earned 17 caps for Luxembourg between 1965 and 1970, appearing in eight FIFA World Cup qualifying matches.

References

1943 births
Living people
Luxembourgian footballers
Luxembourg international footballers
US Mondorf-les-Bains players
Association football midfielders